Sahab SC is football club in Jordan, formed in Amman in 1972. The club is based in and represents the Sahab district.

Current squad

Kit providers
 Kelme

References

External links
 Jordan - Sahab Club - Results, fixtures, tables, statistics - Futbol24
 soccers.fr- Football livescores
 Sahab SC
 Team: Sahab SC
 فريق: سحاب
 Footlive.com - Football results

Football clubs in Jordan
1972 establishments in Jordan
Association football clubs established in 1972